Jaeschkea is a genus of flowering plants belonging to the family Gentianaceae.

Its native range is Afghanistan to Himalaya and Tibet. It is found in Afghanistan, East Himalaya, Nepal, Pakistan, Tibet and West Himalaya.

The genus name of Jaeschkea is in honour of Heinrich August Jäschke (1817–1883), a German Tibetologist missionary and Bible translator.
It was first described and published in J. Asiat. Soc. Bengal, Pt. 2, Nat. Hist. Vol.39 on page 230 in 1870.

Known species
According to Kew:
Jaeschkea canaliculata 
Jaeschkea microsperma 
Jaeschkea oligosperma

References

Gentianaceae
Gentianaceae genera
Plants described in 1870
Flora of Afghanistan
Flora of Pakistan
Flora of Tibet
Flora of the Indian subcontinent